Lago di Acerenza is a lake in the Province of Potenza, Basilicata, Italy. At an elevation of 455 m, its surface area is 2 km².

Lakes of Basilicata